Alberto Aguilar Mejía (born 3 September 1960) is a Mexican former professional footballer and manager.

Honours
Individual
Toulon Tournament Best Goalkeeper: 1978

References

1960 births
Living people
Association football goalkeepers
Club León footballers
Coyotes Neza footballers
Tampico Madero F.C. footballers
Club Puebla players
C.F. Cobras de Querétaro players
Cruz Azul footballers
Atlético Morelia players
Tigres UANL footballers
Liga MX players
Mexican football managers
Comunicaciones F.C. managers
Mexican expatriate football managers
Expatriate football managers in Guatemala
Mexican expatriate sportspeople in Guatemala
Liga MX Femenil managers
Footballers from Tamaulipas
Sportspeople from Tampico, Tamaulipas
Mexican footballers